The Roman Catholic Diocese of Doumé–Abong’ Mbang is a diocese located in the cities of Doumé and Abong’ Mbang in the Ecclesiastical province of Bertoua in Cameroon.

History
 March 3, 1949: Established as Apostolic Vicariate of Doumé from the Apostolic Vicariate of Yaoundé
 September 14, 1955: Promoted as Diocese of Doumé
 March 17, 1983: Renamed as Diocese of Doumé–Abong’ Mbang

Bishops

Ordinaries, in reverse chronological order
 Bishops of Doumé–Abong’ Mbang (Roman rite), below
 Bishop Jan Ozga (since April 20, 1997)
 Bishop Pierre Augustin Tchouanga, S.C.I. (March 17, 1983  – February 24, 1995)
 Bishops of Doumé (Roman rite), below
 Bishop Lambertus Johannes van Heygen, C.S.Sp. (April 16, 1962  – March 17, 1983), appointed Bishop of Bertoua; future Archbishop
 Bishop Jacques Teerenstra, C.S.Sp. (September 14, 1955  – January 28, 1961); see below
 Vicars Apostolic of Doumé (Roman rite), below
 Bishop Jacques Teerenstra, C.S.Sp. (1951 – September 14, 1955); see above
 Bishop René Graffin, C.S.Sp. (March 3, 1949  – March 15, 1951) resigned; appointed Archbishop of Yaoundé in 1955

Auxiliary bishop
Jacques Teerenstra, C.S.Sp. (1949-1951), appointed Vicar Apostolic here

See also
Roman Catholicism in Cameroon

References

External links
 GCatholic.org

Roman Catholic dioceses in Cameroon
Christian organizations established in 1949
Roman Catholic dioceses and prelatures established in the 20th century
1949 establishments in French Cameroon
Roman Catholic Ecclesiastical Province of Bertoua